Cherilyn Elston is a British academic and translator, specializing in Latin American culture and literature. She studied at Oxford and Cambridge universities, obtaining a PhD in Latin American Studies from the latter. Her doctoral thesis formed the basis for her book Women’s Writing in Colombia – An Alternative History. As a literary translator, she has translated Southerly by the Argentinean writer Jorge Consiglio for Charco Press. She is also the editor of Palabras Errantes  an online journal of literary translation.

She currently teaches at Reading University.

References

British translators
Living people
Year of birth missing (living people)
Academics of the University of Reading